Aadmi Khilona Hai ( Man is a toy) is a 1993 Bollywood drama film, produced by Padma Rani under the FILMYUG Pvt. Ltd. banner and directed by J. Om Prakash. It stars Jeetendra, Govinda, Reena Roy, Meenakshi Sheshadri in the pivotal roles and music composed by Nadeem-Shravan.

Plot
The film begins with a family knitted with a fragrance of love and affection. Vijay Verma its paterfamilias lives along with his ideal wife Ganga, devoted younger brother Sharad and a daughter Guddy. Sharad loves his fellow collegian Poonam gets married and acquires a fine job but sadly, gets separated from his family. After a while, Ganga gives birth to the second child Suraj. Eventually, she learns that Poonam can never conceive, and benevolent Ganga bestows her child for adoption. Here, Vijay feels proud of Ganga. Time passes, Sharad earns well, and additionally, Vijay wins a huge amount in a lottery. Then, Ganga a shade of selfishness embarks in Ganga and she decides to retrieve her son. Despite the urges of Poonam. However, Sharad gives back the child and quits the place. Knowing it, Vijay screams, disowns Ganga, and leaves with his children. Thus, Ganga is unable to bear the guilt and struck herself. Meanwhile, Vijay reaches Sharad and apologizes by returning to Suraj. Immediately, Sharad & Poonam rushes to Ganga when they spot her in an unconscious state. After that, she pleads for pardon from everyone and they forgive her. Finally, the movie ends on a happy note with the reunion of the family.

Cast
Jeetendra as Madan Verma
Reena Roy as Ganga Verma
Govinda as Sharad Verma 
Meenakshi Sheshadri as Poonam Verma 
Laxmikant Berde as Champaklal
Sulabha Deshpande as Bua
Sushmita Mukherjee as Roopmati
Tej Sapru as Raghunath
Anjan Srivastav as Poonam's Dadu
Dalip Tahil as Rangraj

Soundtracks

External links 
 

1993 films
1990s Hindi-language films
Films scored by Nadeem–Shravan
Films directed by J. Om Prakash
Hindi-language drama films